Tony Snell may refer to:

Tony Snell (poet) (born 1938), Cornish teacher, linguist, scholar, singer, waterman, and poet
Tony Snell (basketball) (born 1991), American basketball player
Tony Snell (RAF officer) (1922–2013), RAF pilot and World War II escapee